The Atlantic Coast Conference Men's Soccer Coach of the Year is an annual award given to the best head coach in the Atlantic Coast Conference during the NCAA Division I men's soccer season. The award has been given since 1975.

Notable winners of the award include: Bruce Arena (who later coached the United States men's soccer team and LA Galaxy), I. M. Ibrahim (who spent his entire coaching career with Clemson University), Anson Dorrance (who later simultaneously coached the University of Carolina's women's soccer team and the United States women's soccer team) and Jay Vidovich (who went on to coach Portland Timbers 2 for a season, before returning to collegiate soccer).

Arena and Vidovich are currently tied for the most times having won the award, with seven wins each.

Winners

Coach of the Year (1975–present)

References

NCAA Division I men's soccer conference coaches of the year
Coach of the Year
Awards established in 1975